Gordon L. Freedman is an American author and investigator who served on the Watergate Committee, Fraser Committee and U.S. Senate Committee on Civil Service. Freedman co-authored Gifts of Deceit (1980) and Winter of Fire (1990).

Biography 
Gordon Freedman grew up in Charlevoix, Michigan and studied at Michigan State University, where he graduated with a Bachelor of Arts in Communications.

Freedman was a member of the United States Senate Watergate Committee, which was established in 1973 to investigate the Watergate scandal involving US President Richard Nixon. Freedman, then a student at Michigan University, drove to Washington, D.C. and stood in line at 5:30 am every morning to listen to the hearings. He then started visiting members of the committee door to door, in the hopes of being able to work on the committee. He was eventually hired by Senator Herman Talmadge's office, and later joined the committee. After Watergate, he worked on Capitol Hill as a researcher and investigator for five years. He was the committee investigator for the United States Senate Committee on Civil Service.

In 1978, he was a staff investigator on the Subcommittee on International Organizations of the Committee on International Relations during the Koreagate scandal. In 1980, he co-wrote Gifts of Deceit, an account of the Koreagate scandal and the committee's investigations, with Robert Boettcher.

In 1990, Freedman co-wrote Winter of Fire with Richard O. Collin, which dealt with US Army general James L. Dozier's kidnapping by the Italian terrorist group the Red Brigades.

Freedman produced and directed a number of documentaries and biographical films, including the miniseries Baby M. Freedman flew to New Jersey to gather 7,000 pages of transcripts and documents, as well as videotapes from ABC's networks, which formed the basis of the script. Freedman received an Emmy nomination for the miniseries, which aired on ABC in 1988.

In 1991, he produced the documentary film adaptation of Stephen Hawking's A Brief History of Time, which was directed by Errol Morris. The film won a Grand Jury Prize at the Sundance Film Festival.

References 

People from Charlevoix, Michigan
Watergate scandal investigators
American political writers
American non-fiction writers
Living people
Year of birth missing (living people)